The 1999 Kaduna State gubernatorial election occurred on January 9, 1999. Ahmed Makarfi of the PDP defeated Suleiman Zuntu of the APP and Wakili Kadima of AD to come winner in the elections.

Ahmed Makarfi emerged winner in the PDP gubernatorial primary election. His running mate was Stephen Rijo Shekari.

Electoral system 
The Governor of Kaduna State is elected using the plurality voting system.

Results
PDP's Ahmed Makarfi emerged winner in the contest.

The total number of registered voters in the state for the election was 2,536,702. However, 2,557,800 were previously issued voting cards in the state.

References 

Kaduna State gubernatorial elections
Kaduna State gubernatorial election
Kaduna State gubernatorial election